Gustavo Caballero Camargo (born 24 July 1948) is a Mexican politician affiliated with the Institutional Revolutionary Party. As of 2014 he served as Deputy of the LX Legislature of the Mexican Congress representing Nuevo León.

References

1948 births
Living people
Politicians from Nuevo León
Institutional Revolutionary Party politicians
21st-century Mexican politicians
Deputies of the LX Legislature of Mexico
Members of the Chamber of Deputies (Mexico) for Nuevo León